Hopkins is an unincorporated community in eastern Wake County, North Carolina, United States.  The center of the community lies at the crossroads of Hopkins Chapel Road and Fowler Road, near North Carolina Highway 96, about three miles north of the town of Zebulon.

References

Unincorporated communities in Wake County, North Carolina
Unincorporated communities in North Carolina